Anthony Low (born 18 August 1983) is a Scottish former footballer who played as a midfielder for Inverness Caledonian Thistle, Brora Rangers, Albion Rovers, Clachnacuddin, Buckie Thistle, Elgin City, Nairn County and Peterhead.

Career

Brora Rangers (loan) 
Before Low joined the Inverness first team, Low went out on loan to local Highland League side, Brora Rangers, finishing the season in 8th place.

Inverness Caledonian Thistle 
Low joined Scottish First Division side Inverness Caledonian Thistle in 2002, making his professional debut in a Challenge Cup loss against Berwick Rangers, before making his league debut in a 2–1 home loss to Falkirk on 17 August. Anthony scored his first, and only, goal in a 2–0 home win against Arbroath.

The following season, he made only one appearance, a 1–1 league draw away to Highland Derby rivals, Ross County on 30 August.

Albion Rovers (loan) 
On deadline day in August 2003, Anthony was brought to Third Division side, Albion Rovers on loan. He left the club at the end of the season and rejoining, now Scottish Premier League side, Inverness.

Highland League 
In 2004, Anthony left Inverness CT after being deemed surplus to requirement, and joined fellow Invernessians and Highland League Champions, Clachnacuddin. However, after a year long spell, he left, and joined Nairn County, on a year long deal, where he won the North of Scotland Cup. In 2006, he briefly joined Second Division side, Peterhead, before leaving a year later and playing for a year at Buckie Thistle winning the Aberdeenshire Shield. In 2008, he returned to the SFL, this time joining Elgin City in the Third Division, where he made six appearances. In 2009 he returned to Nairn County, where he played for four years, winning the Highland League Cup. At the end of the 2011–12 season, Low took a break from football, before returning to the game for one more year at his former side, Peterhead.

Honours 
Inverness Caledonian Thistle
 Inverness Cup: 2001–02
 Scottish First Division: 2003–04

Nairn County
 North of Scotland Cup: 2005–06
 Highland League Cup: 2010–11

Buckie Thistle
 Aberdeenshire Shield: 2007–08

References

1983 births
Living people
Scottish footballers
Association football midfielders
Inverness Caledonian Thistle F.C. players
Brora Rangers F.C. players
Albion Rovers F.C. players
Clachnacuddin F.C. players
Nairn County F.C. players
Peterhead F.C. players
Buckie Thistle F.C. players
Elgin City F.C. players